West of the Brazos is a 1950 American Western film directed by Thomas Carr for Lippert Pictures and starring James Ellison.

Plot

Cast
James Ellison
Russell Hayden

References

External links

1950 films
American Western (genre) films
Films directed by Thomas Carr
1950 Western (genre) films
Lippert Pictures films
American black-and-white films
1950s English-language films
1950s American films